The 2026 European Athletics Championships will be the 27th edition of the European Athletics Championships and will be held in Birmingham, United Kingdom. The dates are to be confirmed.

The 2022 Commonwealth Games host city was selected after Budapest pulled out of bidding. The redeveloped Alexander Stadium in Perry Barr will be used to host the championships. This will be first time that the event will be held in the United Kingdom.

References 

European Athletics Championships